Kedaulatan Rakyat (People's Sovereignty, abbreviated as KR) is a daily newspaper in Yogyakarta, Indonesia. The paper was founded by H. Soemadi and M. Wonohito. The first edition of the newspaper was published on September 27, 1945.

Initially, Kedaulatan Rakyat consisted of 16 pages. Recently, it has become the largest newspaper in Yogyakarta and southern Central Java, and circulates 125,000 copies. It is considered the first newspaper to be published after Indonesian independence, as well as the oldest continuously published newspaper in Indonesia.

Its motto is Suara Hati Nurani Rakyat (Voice of the People's Conscience).

History

KR is the second newspaper to be published in Yogyakarta after the Javanese-language newspaper Sedya Tama, was published biweekly. When Sedya Tama was banned by the Japanese, the Japanese army established a new newspaper called Sinar Matahari (Sunlight). Driven by the desire to publish an Indonesian-owned newspaper by the Indonesian government, after its independence H. Soemadi, M. Wonohito and Sinar Matahari staff members - who were mostly Indonesian - took over the paper and established a new daily called Kedaulatan Rakyat. The phrase Kedaulatan Rakyat is taken from the Preamble to the 1945 Constitution.

External links
 Official site
 KR e-paper site
 http://www.pnri.go.id/official_v2005.5/directories/publishers/index.asp?box=detail&id=2007219123225

Indonesian press
Newspapers published in Yogyakarta
1945 establishments in Indonesia
Newspapers established in 1945